The ALFA 40/60 HP is a road car and race car made by Italian car manufacturer ALFA (later to become Alfa Romeo). This model was made between 1913 and 1922 and was designed by Giuseppe Merosi, as were all other Alfas at that time.

In 1914 the milanese count Marco Ricotti commissioned to Carrozzeria Castagna the ALFA 40/60 HP Aerodinamica (also known as Siluro Ricotti), a prototype model which could reach  top speed. A replica of that car was created in the 1970s, and now it is shown in the Alfa Romeo Historical Museum.

40/60 HP production and development was interrupted by the First World War, but resumed briefly afterwards. Giuseppe Campari won the 1920 and 1921 races at Mugello with this car.

Specifications

The 40-60 HP was based on a ladder chassis of C-shaped stamped steel rails.

The en bloc cylinder block and cylinder head were split in two groups of two cylinders, and made of cast iron; the crankcase was cast aluminium, incorporating the four engine mountings.
The two in-block camshafts were driven by a gear train located at the front of the engine.

The driveline comprised a dry multi-plate clutch, a four-speed gearbox and a one-piece propeller shaft, spinning inside a tube attached to the rear differential housing. At its open end, towards the gearbox, this tube forked out into two ends which, linked to the chassis, located the rear axle. The gearbox was positioned towards the middle of the chassis, almost underneath the driver, rather than in block with the engine—to which it was connected by a short prop shaft.
Front and rear solid axles were sprung on longitudinal semi-elliptic leaf springs.
Brakes were drums on the rear wheels, with both pedal and hand controls. The wheels were 5.5x19" Sankey-type pressed steel.

40-60 HP tipo corsa
Kerb weight was  versus .
The racing-prepared engine was fitted with two carburettors and had a 5.50:1 compression ratio. The final drive ratio was 18/49 instead of the standard 17/49.
The Sankey steel wheels were replaced by 6.0x20" knock-off wire wheels.

References

Notes

Bibliography

External links

 ALFA 40-60 HP Castagna Siluro Aerodinamica 1914 on autoconcept-reviews.com

40 60 HP
Cars introduced in 1913
1920s cars